Laiwu was a prefecture-level city in central Shandong Province, China. Bordered the provincial capital of Jinan to the north, Zibo to the east and Tai'an to the southwest, it was the smallest prefecture-level city in the province. It had a population of 1,298,529 as of the 2010 census, all living in the built-up (or metro) area made of 2 urban Districts and became part of Jinan in 2019 and 907,839 living in urban area.

Administration

The prefecture-level city of Laiwu administered two county-level divisions, both of which were districts.

Laicheng District
Gangcheng District

They were further divided into 19 township-level divisions, including 14 towns, one townships and four subdistricts.

Since the 1st January, 2019, Laiwu was merged into Jinan which is the capital city of Shandong province, and is no longer a prefecture-level city any more.

References

External links 
 

Cities in Shandong
Former prefectures in Shandong
Populated places established in 1992
Populated places disestablished in 2019
1992 establishments in China
2019 disestablishments in China
Jinan